Sericomyia transversa	 (Osburn, 1926), the  Yellow-spotted Pond Fly , is an uncommon species of syrphid fly observed in northeastern North America.. Hoverflies can remain nearly motionless in flight. The  adults are also  known as flower flies for they are commonly found on flowers, from which they get both energy-giving nectar and protein-rich pollen. The larvae of this genus are known as rat tailed maggots for the long posterior breathing tube.

References

Eristalinae
Articles created by Qbugbot
Insects described in 1926
Hoverflies of North America